Glenea scalaris is a species of beetle in the family Cerambycidae. It was described by James Thomson in 1865.

Subspecies
 Glenea scalaris sandakensis Breuning, 1956
 Glenea scalaris scalaris Thomson, 1865

References

scalaris
Beetles described in 1865